Albert Mervill Nibte (born 20 May 1993) is a Surinamese professional footballer who plays as a defender for SVB Eerste Divisie club Leo Victor and the Suriname national team.

International career 
Nibte's debut for Suriname came on 30 January 2015 in a 3–0 friendly victory over Bonaire. His first competitive match was a 0–0 (3–2 on penalties) loss against Guadeloupe in Caribbean Cup qualification on 23 March 2016.

In June 2021, Nibte was named to the Suriname squad for the 2021 CONCACAF Gold Cup.

Honours 
Leo Victor
 SVB Cup: 2013–14

Inter Moengotapoe
 SVB Eerste Divisie: 2014–15, 2015–16

References

External links 
 
 

1993 births
Living people
Surinamese footballers
Association football defenders
Sportspeople from Paramaribo
S.V. Leo Victor players
Inter Moengotapoe players
2021 CONCACAF Gold Cup players
SVB Eerste Divisie players
Suriname under-20 international footballers
Suriname youth international footballers
Suriname international footballers